The 1985–86 New York Islanders season was the 14th season for the franchise in the National Hockey League.

Offseason

Regular season

Final standings

Schedule and results

Season summary
 January 28: In a 9-2 victory over the Toronto Maple Leafs, Denis Potvin breaks Bobby Orr's NHL career record for goals by a defenseman.

Playoffs
The Islanders lost in their best-of-three series in the first round to the Washington Capitals.

Round 1: New York Islanders (3) vs. Washington Capitals (2)

Game 1- Islanders 1, Capitals 3

Game 2- Islanders 2, Capitals 5

Game 3- Capitals 3, Islanders 1

Washington wins series 3-0

Player statistics

Note: Pos = Position; GP = Games played; G = Goals; A = Assists; Pts = Points; +/- = plus/minus; PIM = Penalty minutes; PPG = Power-play goals; SHG = Short-handed goals; GWG = Game-winning goals
      MIN = Minutes played; W = Wins; L = Losses; T = Ties; GA = Goals-against; GAA = Goals-against average; SO = Shutouts; SA = Shots against; SV = Shots saved; SV% = Save percentage;

Awards and records

Transactions

Draft picks
New York's draft picks at the 1985 NHL Entry Draft held at the Metro Toronto Convention Centre in Toronto, Ontario.

Farm teams

See also
 1985–86 NHL season

References

External links

New York Islanders seasons
New York Islanders
New York Islanders
New York Islanders
New York Islanders